The Gimnasio Campestre is an all-male, elite-traditional Pre-K to 11th grade private school located in Bogotá, Colombia.

Origin
It was founded in 1946 by Alfonso Casas Morales, and its educational legacy has prepared several generations of "gimnasianos", as its alumni are known, offering them an education that has stressed the school motto, to "be men of honor". In 1987, after the passing of Mr. Casas, who served also as Principal and Director of the school since its creation, the board of directors chose Mr. Jorge Bernardo Londoño as his successor.

Expansion
Continuing with Mr Casas' legacy, and preparing the school for the 21st century, Mr. Londoño began the modernization of the facilities, building a multi-court/ multi-purpose sports center, which also doubles as a concert hall.  

It was during this period that the traditional field trips for high-school seniors were extended to week-long excursions for every class, from 1st to 11th grade, to diverse destinations in Colombia and abroad.

Mr. Londoño was succeeded by Dr. Jaime Bernal, a medical geneticist, who due to his profession and his interest in scientific discovery, re-directed the modernization process to include an observatory (a participant of NASA's Radio Jove Project), and the most modern Molecular Biology Lab of any secondary education institution in the country.

Students receive half of their classes in English and learn French as a third language. Since 2016, the school is internationally accredited by two highly known accreditation agencies: New England Association of Schools and Colleges (NEASC) and Council of International Schools (CIS).

Accomplishments

The Gimnasio Campestre has a long tradition in Bogotá's history, where many graduates have become influential figures both at the local and at the national level.  The school recently obtained an international certification by the Bureau Veritas for adhering to international teaching standards.  

Among the extracurricular activities promoted by the school are a citywide known military band, a Boy Scout troop, a student-run radio station, and a media room broadcasting school events in closed-circuit television, as well as prominent intramural and extramural sports teams.  

Two traditional yearly events include the "Copa Tradición" and the "Batuta de Plata", the former a soccer match with the arch-rival team of the Gimnasio Moderno, the latter a marching band competition with prominent local school bands. 

The Gimnasio Moderno and the Gimnasio Campestre have enjoyed for decades a healthy competition in sports and other events, and both schools continue to share a tradition of high ethical standards and scholarly comradeship.

After the successful reforms in which Mr. Londoño and Mr. Bernal committed, Juan Antonio Casas Pardo, son of Alfonso Casas, was appointed to continue with the school's legacy.

Headmasters 
Alfonso Casas Morales (1945-1987).
Jorge Bernardo Londoño (1987-1997).
Jaime Eduardo Bernal Villegas (1998-2006).
Juan Antonio Casas Pardo (2006-2017).
Alejandro Noguera Cepeda (2017-now).

Community impact
Students are highly involved with the neighboring communities, and the school recently inaugurated a public library featuring over 3000 titles available to low-income students of public schools. Gimnasianos also volunteer many hours of community service and every Friday donate groceries and non-perishable items to be distributed among low income families of nearby neighborhoods.

Its Alumni Association] has maintained a network of former students that expands over five decades and several generations, providing services such as a job bank and a bi-monthly newsletter that help reinforce the bonds created by classmates and their families during the thirteen years of shared experiences at the school.

Today, the Gimnasio Campestre's headmaster is the ex-student, Mr. Alejandro Noguera, who assumed his position in 2017, when Dr. Alfonso Casas' son, Juan Antonio left the school.

The school's guiding motto is "Have your country in your heart and the world in your head." The school is a member of Round Square, an international network of schools with a commitment to internationalism and community service.

Military band

In 1954, the founder hired a former army sergeant to take charge of starting the military band. With six drums and six horns the rehearsals began. The first members of the band began to educate the ear, to train in the arts of music and war marches, and to begin practicing percussion and winds.

Eduardo Palou de Comasema y Morgadanes was the first band leader, the rest of the group was formed between the ninth, tenth and eleventh grades, from which the 11 remaining volunteers emerged.

The school's military band participates every year in the "Batuta de Plata" Contest, a trophy it has won three times (2002, 2005 and 2014), obtaining in each of these the highest awards given by the jury; the best band leader (2002 and 2005), and of course the best band.

The merit of the Gimnasio Campestre band is that it is conducted solely and exclusively by its members. Every year, elections are held where the members themselves choose the eight leaders who are to direct the destinies of the band. From the young cymbals to the of eleventh graders, they cast their vote to choose the candidate who best represents the standards of the leading "gimnasiano", distinguishing each year the best of each instrument.

Today the band has seven types of musical instruments: bass drums, cymbals, lyres, grenadiers, snare drums, timbals and trumpets; being these last two instruments for which the band has stood out in the last contests that they have carried out in the city.

leader of the band 2023-2024 is Currently Miguel Maya jaramillo

Alumni
Alumni include Ministers such as Enrique Low Murtra (one of the first victims of narco-terrorism while Minister of Justice during Virgilio Barco's presidency), Alberto Carrasquilla (former Minister of Finance), the former and recently re-elected Mayor of Bogotá Enrique Peñalosa, as well as relevant scientists, artists, Senators, and House Representatives, among others.

External links
Gimnasio Campestre
Asoexalumnos (The Alumni Association)

Images
School's Seal
School's Church
Founder's Tomb
School Building
Courtyard
Administrative Offices

References

Schools in Bogotá
1945 establishments in Colombia
Educational institutions established in 1945